The  was an infantry division of the Imperial Japanese Army. It was formed on 2 February 1942 in Jiujiang city as a class C (security) division, simultaneously with the 69th and 70th divisions. The backbone of security division has consisted of the eight independent infantry battalions, and it does not have an artillery regiment. The nucleus for the formation was the 14th Independent mixed brigade.

Action
The 68th division has started a garrison duty from April 1942, covering an area of the former 14th Independent mixed brigade. The 68th division took part in the Battle of West Hubei in April 1943. At the end of 1943, it participated in Battle of Changde, operating in Hanshou County.

In May 1944, the 68th division was assigned to 11th army and has participated in Operation Ichi-Go, particularly on the southern flank of the defense of Hengyang.

After the end of the offensive, the 68th division was assigned to 20th army and participated in the Battle of West Hunan from April 1945.

See also
 List of Japanese Infantry Divisions
Independent Mixed Brigades (Imperial Japanese Army)

Notes
This article incorporates material from Japanese Wikipedia page 第68師団 (日本軍), accessed 19 June 2016

Reference and further reading

 Madej, W. Victor. Japanese Armed Forces Order of Battle, 1937-1945 [2 vols]
Allentown, PA: 1981

Japanese World War II divisions
Infantry divisions of Japan
Military units and formations established in 1942
Military units and formations disestablished in 1945
1942 establishments in Japan
1945 disestablishments in Japan